Sun Zhiwei (born  October 16, 1965) is a Chinese mathematician, working primarily in number theory, combinatorics, and group theory. He is a professor at Nanjing University.

Biography
Sun Zhiwei was born in Huai'an, Jiangsu. Sun and his twin brother Sun Zhihong proved a theorem about what are now known as the Wall–Sun–Sun primes.

Sun proved Sun's curious identity in 2002. In 2003, he presented a unified approach to three topics of Paul Erdős in combinatorial number theory: covering systems, restricted sumsets, and zero-sum problems or EGZ Theorem.

With Stephen Redmond, he posed the Redmond–Sun conjecture in 2006.

In 2013, he published a paper containing many conjectures on primes, one of which states that for any positive integer  there are consecutive primes  not exceeding  such that , where  denotes the -th prime.

He is the Editor-in-Chief of the Journal of Combinatorics and Number Theory.

Notes

External links
 Zhi-Wei Sun's homepage

1965 births
20th-century  Chinese mathematicians
21st-century  Chinese mathematicians
Mathematicians from Jiangsu
Combinatorialists
Living people
Academic staff of Nanjing University
Number theorists
Scientists from Huai'an
Squares in number theory
Educators from Huai'an
Chinese twins